Kalakalay (from kala "black" and kalay "village" in "Hindi" language) is an old village in Tehsil Kabal, Swat District, Khyber Pakhtunkhwa, Pakistan. In the east side of Kalakaly Galoch is situated. A small riverine flows in the middle of Kalakaly and Galoch. The population consists of approximately 10,000 inhabitants. The main clans living in the village are Dawlat Khan Khel, Mamu Khel, Shaborkhel, Wlaikhel, Sayyid (Miagan), Mulan and other professional people. The main language is Pashto and a large number of people are also fluent in speaking Urdu. Mostly people depend on agriculture and foreign labour. Approximately 40 percent of population is educated. The villagers are facilitated by two government schools for the education of boys and girls, and one eye hospital made by a welfare trust LRBT.
The village is linked by road to the city Mingora and other parts of Pakistan.

Populated places in Swat District